Caloptilia auspex is a moth of the family Gracillariidae. It is known from India (Tamil Nadu).

References

auspex
Moths described in 1912
Moths of Asia